The 1898–99 season was Fulham's first season as a professional club. They competed in the London section of the Southern League Division Two, where they finished 10th out of 12 clubs.

See also
Fulham F.C. seasons

Fulham F.C. seasons
Fulham